"Wings of an Eagle and Other Great Hits" is the first greatest hits compilation by Australian singer songwriter Russell Morris. The album peaked at number 12 on the Go-Set chart in March 1973.

In October 2010, Wings of an Eagle was listed in the book 100 Best Australian Albums at number 59.

Track listing

References

1973 greatest hits albums
Russell Morris albums
Compilation albums by Australian artists
Albums produced by Peter Dawkins (musician)